The 1990 South Carolina Gamecocks football team represented the University of South Carolina as an independent team in the 1990 NCAA Division I-A football season. The Gamecocks were led by Sparky Woods in his second year as head coach.

Schedule

Roster
Bobby Fuller* QB
Wright Mitchell QB
Mike Dingle* RB
Ken Watson* RB
Rob DeBoer RB
Albert Haynes RB
Terry Wilburn RB
Leroy Jeter RB
Frank Adams RB
Eddie Miller* WR
Robert Brooks* WR
George Rush WR
David Pitchko WR
Mario Henry WR
Bralyn Bennett WR
Carl Platt WR
Bill Zorr WR
Darren Greene WR
Charles Steward* TE
Mike Whitman TE
Matthew Campbell TE
Mathew Campbell TE
Hal Hamrick* OL
Ike Harris* OL
Jay Killen* OL
Antoine Rivens* OL
Calvin Stephens* OL
Scott Cooley OL
Rich Sweet OL
Gerald Dixon* DL
Marty Dye* DL
Corey Miller* DL
Kurt Wilson* DL
Cedric Bembery DL
Ernest Dixon* LB
Patrick Hinton* LB
Joe Reaves* LB
Eric Brown LB
Keith Emmons LB
Leon Harris* DB
Keith McDonald* DB
Cedric Surratt* DB
Antonio Walker* DB
Bru Pender DB

References

Additional sources
 Griffin, J. C. (1992). The first hundred years: A history of South Carolina football. Atlanta, Georgia: Longstreet Press

South Carolina
South Carolina Gamecocks football seasons
South Carolina Gamecocks football